I Wrote And Recorded This In Less Than Five Hours is an official bootleg album by UK based artist Lightspeed Champion and, as the title says, was written and recorded in less than five hours
 in his flat after returning from the V Festival and having a musical buzz. When asked in an interview "Are projects like I Wrote and Recorded This In Less Than Five Hours something you intend to keep up? Or was it just for fun?", Champion responded

Track listing

References

Dev Hynes albums
2007 EPs